The 1990 Chicago White Sox season was the White Sox's 91st season. They finished with a record of 94-68, good enough for 2nd place in the American League West, 9 games behind of the 1st place Oakland Athletics, as the White Sox played their final season at the aging Comiskey Park before moving to the new US Cellular Field the next season.

Regular season 
In the summer of 1990, Michael Jordan took batting practice at Comiskey Park. The following year, Upper Deck created a baseball card of Michael Jordan and it was numbered SP1.

Bobby Thigpen had the best season of his career in 1990, setting the major league record of 57 saves. He also maintained a 1.83 ERA and was named to the AL All-Star team. He also blew eight saves that season, including two three-run leads.

In anticipation of the move to new Comiskey Park, the White Sox adopted classic pinstriped uniforms late in the 1990 season along with the alternate black jerseys, instantly jumping to the top of the league in merchandise sales. Originally to be premiered in the 1991 season, the Sox sported the jerseys during their final days at the old ballpark.

Season standings

Record vs. opponents

1990 Opening Day lineup 
 Lance Johnson, CF
 Scott Fletcher, 2B
 Iván Calderón, LF
 Greg Walker, DH
 Carlton Fisk, C
 Carlos Martínez, 1B
 Robin Ventura, 3B
 Sammy Sosa, RF
 Ozzie Guillén, SS
 Mélido Pérez, P

Notable transactions 
 June 4, 1990: Alex Fernandez was drafted by the White Sox in the 1st round of the 1990 amateur draft.
 June 4, 1990: Bob Wickman was drafted by the Chicago White Sox in the 2nd round of the 1990 amateur draft. Player signed June 6, 1990.
 June 4, 1990: Ray Durham was drafted by the Chicago White Sox in the 5th round of the 1990 amateur draft. Player signed June 5, 1990.
 June 4, 1990: Jason Bere was drafted by the Chicago White Sox in the 36th round of the 1990 amateur draft. Player signed June 6, 1990.
 July 30, 1990: Phil Bradley was traded by the Baltimore Orioles to the Chicago White Sox for Ron Kittle.

No Hitter 
 July 1, 1990 – New York Yankees pitcher Andy Hawkins threw a no-hitter against the Chicago White Sox and lost the game. A scoreless game until the bottom of the 8th inning, Sammy Sosa started the rally by hitting a ground ball that Yankee third basemen Mike Blowers bobbled. Initially it was ruled a hit. Yankee manager Stump Merrill was standing on the top of the dugout steps barking up in the direction of the press box. Quickly the play was changed to an error on Blowers. Sosa then stole second base. Ozzie Guillén and Lance Johnson both then drew walks to load the bases. The next batter, Robin Ventura hit a fly ball that eluded Yankees left fielder Jim Leyritz allowing three unearned runs to score. The next batter, Iván Calderón, then lifted a fly ball to right field that was dropped by Jesse Barfield making the score 4-0.

Line Score 

July 1, Comiskey Park, Chicago, Illinois

Batting

Pitching

Turn Back the Clock Day 
On July 11, 1990, as part of the celebration of Comiskey Park, the White Sox played a Turn Back the Clock game against the Milwaukee Brewers. The White Sox wore their 1917 home uniforms. This was the first Turn Back the Clock game in the major leagues and started what has become a popular promotion. The club turned off the electronic scoreboards and public address system. They constructed a special manually operated scoreboard in center field for the day and even the grounds-crew wore period costume. General admission tickets were sold for $0.50, popcorn was a nickel, and the stadium organ was shut down for the game.

Line Score 
July 11, Comiskey Park, Chicago, Illinois

Batting

Roster

Player stats

Batting 
Note: G = Games played; AB = At bats; R = Runs scored; H = Hits; 2B = Doubles; 3B = Triples; HR = Home runs; RBI = Runs batted in; BB = Base on balls; SO = Strikeouts; AVG = Batting average; SB = Stolen bases

Pitching 
Note: W = Wins; L = Losses; ERA = Earned run average; G = Games pitched; GS = Games started; SV = Saves; IP = Innings pitched; H = Hits allowed; R = Runs allowed; ER = Earned runs allowed; HR = Home runs allowed; BB = Walks allowed; K = Strikeouts

Awards and honors 
 Bobby Thigpen, Major League Record, 57 saves in one season
 Bobby Thigpen, MLB All-Star Game, reserve
 Jeff Torborg, Associated Press Manager of the Year

Farm system

References

External links 
 1990 Chicago White Sox at Baseball Reference
 1990 Chicago White Sox at Baseball Almanac
1990 White Sox Documentary

Chicago White Sox seasons
Chicago White Sox season
White